"Le courrier du cœur" ("The advice column") is the seventh single by the French singer-songwriter Jacques Dutronc. It was released in 1968. The song was recorded for his second album, Jacques Dutronc. It reached number 8 on the French singles chart in summer 1968.

Track listing 
Words by Jacques Lanzmann and Anne Ségalen, music by Jacques Dutronc.

Side A

Side B

References

Jacques Dutronc songs
1968 singles
Songs written by Jacques Lanzmann
Songs written by Jacques Dutronc
1968 songs
Disques Vogue singles